Chowdhury Fazlul Bari is a former Bangladesh Army officer and former Director General of Directorate General of Forces Intelligence.

Career
Bari joined the elite Rapid Action Battalion (RAB) in 2004 when it was founded. As a Lieutenant colonel he served as the Additional director general of RAB. The last post he held in RAB was additional director general. In 2005 he defended Rapid Action Battalions practice of extrajudicial killing of suspects to the US embassy. He was made Director of DGFI by the then BNP lead government. During military backed Caretaker government headed by Fakhruddin Ahmed, he became the chief of DGFI. However, at the end of the caretaker government he was posted to Bangladesh's diplomatic mission in Washington, D.C. 

Tarique Rahman, son of former Prime Minister Khaleda Zia, accused him of leading his torture. He was recalled from his post after the elected Awami League government took power. He sought an extension but Government did not grant it and later Bangladesh Army declared him absconding without leave (AWL) officer. 

In 2009 Bari declared a deserter. During the caretaker administration he tried to aid Bangladesh Freedom Party and National Democratic Alliance. The freedom party was formed by the military officers who killed Sheikh Mujibur Rahman, the first president of Bangladesh in a coup. He married Mehnaz Rashid, the eldest daughter of Lieutenant Colonel Khandaker Abdur Rashid, one the killers of Sheikh Mujib and a leader of the Freedom Party. He divorced her in December 2008. He denied marrying her. In 2009 he applied for political asylum in the United States.

References

Living people
Bangladesh Army brigadiers
Directors General of the Directorate General of Forces Intelligence
Year of birth missing (living people)